Anders Hellqvist (born 5 December 1963) is a Swedish judoka. He competed in the men's extra-lightweight event at the 1984 Summer Olympics.

References

1963 births
Living people
Swedish male judoka
Olympic judoka of Sweden
Judoka at the 1984 Summer Olympics
Sportspeople from Stockholm
20th-century Swedish people